Sheikh Helal Uddin is a Bangladesh Awami League politician and member of parliament from Bagerhat-1.

Early life 
Sheikh Helal was born on 1 January 1961. He studied up to H.S.C. or grade 12. His father Sheikh Naser was the younger brother of Sheikh Mujib, the first president of Bangladesh, who was killed in assassination of Sheikh Mujib. He is the cousin of Prime Minister of Bangladesh Sheikh Hasina.

Career 
Sheikh Helal's election rally in Mollahat Upazila in 2001 was bombed by members Harkat-ul-Jihad al-Islami. He was elected to Parliament from Bagerhat-1 in 1996 in a by-election after Prime Minister Sheikh Hasina abdicated the seat. She was elected in 3 seats. He was re-elected in 2001 from Bagerhat-1. In 2008, Sheikh Hasina won the election from Bagerhat-1, Rangpur-6, and Gopalganj-3 but vacated Bagerhat-1 and Rangpur-6. He won the Bagerhat-1 election in April 2009 unopposed after the other two candidates were disqualified by Bangladesh Election Commission. He was re-elected in Bagerhat-1 in 2014.

Personal life 
Sheikh Helal's son, Sheikh Sharhan Naser Tonmoy(Sheikh Tonmoy), is a Bangladesh Awami League politician and is the new member of parliament who was elected from 2018 election from Bagerhat-2. He is married to Rupa Chowdhury. His brother, Sheikh Salahuddin Jewel, is the member of parliament from Khulna-2.

References

Awami League politicians
Living people
Sheikh Mujibur Rahman family
7th Jatiya Sangsad members
8th Jatiya Sangsad members
9th Jatiya Sangsad members
10th Jatiya Sangsad members
11th Jatiya Sangsad members
1961 births
Bangladeshi people of Arab descent